Cosmic Girl is a Boeing 747-400 aircraft. A former passenger airliner operated by Virgin Atlantic, it was purchased by Virgin Galactic in 2015 to be used as the first stage launch platform (or mothership launch pad) for the air launch stage of the smallsat orbital launch vehicle, the LauncherOne. In 2017, the aircraft was transferred to the orbital launch subsidiary, Virgin Orbit, and its livery updated to Virgin Orbit. LauncherOne attempted its first launch on 25 May 2020; the launch was a failure. The first successful launch (second launch in total) took place on 17 January 2021.

Airliner
Cosmic Girl was assembled in 2001 at the Boeing Everett Factory. It was configured as a 44/32/310 B747-41R, c/n. 32745. The aircraft's first flight was on 29 September 2001, and it was delivered to Virgin Atlantic on 31 October 2001, where it was registered as G-VWOW.

On 3 November 2005, the aircraft was landing at Runway 27R at Heathrow Airport when a crosswind caused it to roll to the left, and the left-most (No. 1) engine struck the ground.

The plane was transferred to Virgin Galactic in 2015 and re-registered in the United States as N744VG.

Cosmic Girl is currently based at Long Beach Airport. For the second operational flight of the LauncherOne vehicle, however, the plane took off for a launch (which failed) from Newquay Airport, United Kingdom, on 9 January 2023.

Launch platform
The jetliner was in-service with the airline until October 2015. The airliner, previously leased by Virgin Atlantic, was purchased outright by Virgin Group for Virgin Galactic, and registered as N744VG, in November 2015. A 747 was selected due to its carrying capacity. The acquisition of the 747 allowed the use of separate carrying aircraft for SpaceShipTwo and LauncherOne. With the spinoff of Virgin Orbit in 2017, Cosmic Girl was also transferred.

The air launch to orbit LauncherOne rocket was originally envisioned to operate from the smaller airplane WhiteKnightTwo (WK2) launch platform, used for the suborbital Tier 1b system of WK2 and SpaceShipTwo (SS2). As the size of LauncherOne expanded to better encompass the marketplace and acquire marketshare of small launches, the rocket outgrew WK2, leading to the evaluation of bigger launch aircraft, and the acquisition of Cosmic Girl for LauncherOne operations. The use of Cosmic Girl marks the first use of a 747 as a space launch platform.

The LauncherOne attachment pylon is situated on the left wing, where on a normal 747, the fifth engine attachment point is located for ferrying engines. This point is located between the fuselage and the left inboard engine.

Making its first flight on 25 May 2020, a privately funded air-launched rocket, LauncherOne, developed and built by Virgin Orbit, failed to reach space after release from Cosmic Girl over the Pacific Ocean. The second launch, on 17 January 2021, successfully delivered 10 CubeSats to low Earth orbit (LEO). After it was postponed several times due to regulatory issues, the third launch took place on 9 January 2023. The rocket failed to reach orbit.

See also

 Stargazer N140SC; the Orbital L1011 mothership for Pegasus rockets
 Balls 8 52-008; the NASA NB-52B mothership for X-15 rocket planes, lifting bodies, and Pegasus rockets
 WhiteKnightOne N318SL; the Mojave Aerospace Ventures mothership for the SpaceShipOne rocketplane
 Shuttle Carrier Aircraft N905NA; the NASA B747 mothership that was used to air launch Enterprise for test flights

References

Individual aircraft
Boeing 747
Vehicles introduced in 2001
Virgin Orbit
Virgin Galactic
Virgin Atlantic
Aircraft related to spaceflight